Salvatore Lodato (born 7 July 1987), better known by his stage name LODATO, is an American DJ, musician, and remixer. He is best known for his 2019 original single "HOME", which reached #1 on the U.S. Dance Radio Chart for three weeks, #1 on BPM's "Top 20 Count Down" (Sirius XM) for four consecutive weeks and #1 on The Billboard Dance/ Mixshow Airplay Chart. In May 2020, LODATO'S original single "Good" followed the found its way to #1 in the U.S. on Dance Radio. LODATO's Remix of Dua Lipa's "Break My Heart" was added to rotation on all the major U.S. Dance Radio Stations and hit #1 in North America on iHearts RT30 countdown. In late 2020 he signed a record deal with Spinnin records, who recognized him as one of the pioneers of the Dance/POP Genre.

Discography

Singles

Remixes 
 Clean Bandit (ft. Zara Larsson) - Symphony (LODATO & Joseph Duveen Remix)
 Clean Bandit (ft. Sean Paul & Anne-Marie) - Rockabye (LODATO & Joseph Duveen Remix)
 Vassy - Nothing To Lose (LODATO Remix)
 Raquel Castro - Feel Good Castle (LODATO Bootleg)
 Twenty One Pilots - Heathens (LODATO Remix feat. Joseph Duveen & Jaclyn Walker)
 Anne-Marie - Alarm (LODATO Remix)
 Ben Platt & Dear Evan Hansen - Waving Through A Window (LODATO & Joseph Duveen Remix)
 Tiësto - On My Way (LODATO & Sikduo Remix) 
 X Ambassadors - Unsteady (LODATO & Joseph Duveen Remix)
 Vicetone (ft. Jonny Rose) - Stars (LODATO Remix)

Awards and recognition

 Remix of the year 2017, Miami Music Week
 2018: Vassy x LODATO – Doomsday #1 Billboard Dance/Club Songs
 2019: LODATO – HOME - #1 Billboard Dance/Mix Show Airplay                                        
 2019: LODATO – HOME - #1 Dance Radio Airplay Chart (Mediabase)  (3 consecutive weeks)                                      
 2019: LODATO – HOME - #1 Sirius XM (BPM)   (4 Consecutive weeks)
 2019: LODATO – GOOD - #1 Dance Radio Airplay Chart (Mediabase)
 2020: Dua Lipa – Break My Heart (LODATO Remix) #1 iHeart Remix Rt30 Chart

References

External links 
 
 
 
 
 
 
 
 
 
 

Living people
1987 births
American DJs